Vivekananda College may refer to one of several education institutes:

Vivekananda College, Thakurpukur, in Thakurpukur, West Bengal
Vivekananda College for Women, in Barisha, West Bengal
Ramakrishna Mission Vivekananda College, in Chennai, Tamil Nadu, India
Vivekananda College, Madhyamgram, in Madhyamgram, West Bengal, India
Vivekananda College, Madurai, in Thiruvedagam, Tamil Nadu, India
Vivekananda Degree College, Puttur, in Puttur, Karnataka, India
Orr's Hill Vivekananda College, in Trincomalee, Sri Lanka
Ramakrishna Mission Vivekananda Centenary College, in Rahara, West Bengal, India
Vivekananda Mahavidyalaya, in Burdwan, West Bengal, India
Sri Ram Dayal Khemka Vivekananda Vidyalaya Junior College, in Thiruvottiyur, north Chennai, India
Vivekananda College, Alipurduar, in Alipurduar, West Bengal, India